Ghost in the Machine is a 1993 American science fiction horror film directed by Rachel Talalay and released by 20th Century Fox about a deceased serial killer with artificial computer intelligence.

Plot
While working at a computer store in Cleveland, Ohio, serial killer Karl Hochman (Ted Marcoux), known as "The Address Book Killer" due to habitually stealing address books and choosing his victims from them, obtains Terry Munroe's (Karen Allen) address book, due to the store manager, who is demonstrating a scanner, copying a page of her address book into a computer, allowing Karl access to it. On a rainy night while heading home, Karl hurriedly drives into an oncoming lane and swerves to miss a truck. This causes his car to go off the road into a cemetery, all while he laughs like a maniac.

In the emergency room, he is put into an MRI machine. A surge from an electrical storm manages to transfer his soul into a computer. Now, as a network-based entity, Karl continues to plot his killing spree using various objects connected to the electrical grid and computer networks.

Karl opens the scanned page from Terry's address book and begins to kill everyone listed on the page. Her boss, Frank Mallory (Richard McKenzie), becomes the first victim when his microwave oven begins radiating the entire kitchen. Another friend, Elliot Miller (Jack Laufer), gets burned to death when a hand dryer turns into a flamethrower. Later on, babysitter Carol Maibaum (Shevonne Durkin) is hired to look after Terry's son, Josh (Wil Horneff), and his best friend, Frazier (Brandon Adams). However, Carol becomes the third victim; she is electrocuted from an exposed electrical cord on the kitchen floor when the dishwasher explodes and floods the kitchen.

The police do not believe the theory that Karl is on a killing spree after his death, but Josh realizes the order of the killings parallels a list of contacts from Terry's address book. Terry, along with noted computer hacker Bram Walker (Chris Mulkey), unplugs everything in her house.

The police then receive anonymous reports of an armed robbery, a hostage situation, domestic violence, and a murder in progress, all at Terry's house. The police open fire on the home after mistaking an exploding pole transformer for gunfire. After realizing their mistake, they cease fire. Terry's mother goes into shock during the siege and is transported to the hospital for recovery. Aided by Bram and Josh, Bram manages to defeat Karl by introducing a computer virus that traps him in a physics laboratory. They activate an atom smasher located in the lab, which draws Karl in and destroys him because of the extremely powerful magnetic field produced by the machine.

As the film ends, Bram tells Terry to turn off a heart rate monitor in an ambulance, causing the screen to fade to black.

Cast
 Karen Allen as Terry Munroe
 Chris Mulkey as Bram Walker
 Ted Marcoux as Karl Hochman
 Wil Horneff as Josh Munroe
 Jessica Walter as Elaine Spencer
 Brandon Adams as Frazer
 Rick Ducommun as Phil Stewart
 Jack Laufer as Elliott Miller
 Shevonne Durkin as Carol Maibaum
 Richard McKenzie as Frank Mallory
 Nancy Fish as Karl's Landlord
 Richard Schiff as Scanner Technician

Production
In 1987, writers William Davies and William Osborne first got the idea for Ghost in the Machine when reading about a piece of computer software called Skeleton Key, which allowed users to invade other computer networks and retrieve all data within them without owners knowing anything about it, and crafted a premise wherein a serial killer was absorbed into a computer and now possessed those same abilities. Due to the release of Wes Craven's Shocker, 20th Century Fox briefly put the film in Turnaround due to perceived similarities between the two films, however the film resumed development at Fox following uncredited re-writes by Todd Graff.

The film's special effects were provided by Video Image under the direction of special effects supervisor Richard Hollander. In order to create evolutionary images of the electronic serial killer's computerized environment, at the suggestion of director Rachel Talalay, Hollander and his group decided to digitally manipulate real-life data taken from MRI body scans. Ted Marcoux, who plays Killer Karl, was scanned at UCLA.

The film was shot over the course of 51 days in Los Angeles, which doubled for the film's Cleveland, Ohio setting.

Release and reception
Ghost in the Machine had initially been slated for release some time in August 1993, but to avoid competition with Jurassic Park and major fall releases the release was pushed back.

During its opening weekend, Ghost in the Machine grossed $1,854,431 and ranked at no. 10. By the end of its run, it had grossed a domestic total of $5,086,909, failing to recoup its $12 million budget. The film was generally not received well by critics, holding an 11% "Rotten" rating on Rotten Tomatoes based on 9 reviews.

Home Video
Ghost in the Machine was released on VHS and Laserdisc on May 25, 1994, and on DVD on January 17, 2006.

See also
 List of ghost films

References

External links
 
 
 
 

1993 films
1990s science fiction action films
1990s science fiction horror films
1990s serial killer films
1990s ghost films
American science fiction horror films
20th Century Fox films
American science fiction action films
Cyberpunk films
Films scored by Graeme Revell
Films directed by Rachel Talalay
Films set in Cleveland
Films shot in Los Angeles
Films with screenplays by William Davies
American serial killer films
Techno-thriller films
1990s English-language films
1990s American films